Gogebic County (  or  ) is a county in the Upper Peninsula of the U.S. state of Michigan.  As of the 2020 census, the population was 14,380. The county seat is Bessemer. Gogebic County is the westernmost county in Michigan, and is one of four Michigan counties within the Central Time Zone. Gogebic County borders Wisconsin to the south, and has a shoreline on Lake Superior to the north.

Gogebic County has long been territory of the Lake Superior Chippewa. The Lac Vieux Desert Indian Reservation is located within Gogebic County.

History 
Gogebic County was organized in 1887, partitioned from Ontonagon County. The county's name derives from a lake of the same name, which was originally rendered Agogebic. Sources agree that the name is from Ojibwe, but differ on the original meaning. The county's website suggests it meant "body of water hanging on high," but an 1884 military annal said it meant "water-mold lake" (Agogibing). (See also: List of place names of Native American origin in Michigan)

Geography

Water features
 Lake Superior – forms the county's northern land border.
 Lake Gogebic – the largest lake in the Upper Peninsula.
 Montreal River – forms the county's western border, as well as the state's border with Wisconsin in this area.

Adjacent counties
 Ontonagon County – north, northeast
 Iron County – east
 Vilas County, Wisconsin – south
 Iron County, Wisconsin – southwest
 Ashland County, Wisconsin – northwest

National protected area
 Ottawa National Forest (part)

State protected area
 Lake Gogebic State Park

Demographics

The 2010 United States Census indicates Gogebic County had a population of 16,427. This decrease of 943 people from the 2000 United States Census is a -5.4% change in population. In 2010 there were 7,037 households and 4,171 families residing in the county. The population density was 15 people per square mile (6/km2). There were 10,795 housing units at an average density of 10 per square mile (4/km2). 91.7% of the population were White, 4.1% Black or African American, 2.4% Native American, 0.2% Asian, 0.2% of some other race and 1.4% of two or more races. 0.9% were Hispanic or Latino (of any race). 17.4% were of Finnish, 12.8% German, 11.2% American, 10.0% Italian, 6.8% Polish, 6.7% English and 5.1% Irish ancestry.

There were 7,037 households, out of which 20.6% had children under the age of 18 living with them, 45.4% were married couples living together, 9.3% had a female householder with no husband present, and 40.7% were non-families. 35.3% of all households were made up of individuals, and 16.5% had someone living alone who was 65 years of age or older. The average household size was 2.11 and the average family size was 2.69.

The county population was 16.9% under the age of 18, 8.4% from 18 to 24, 22.2% from 25 to 44, 31.1% from 45 to 64, and 21.5% who were 65 years of age or older.  The median age was 46.8 years. 53.3% of the population was male, and 46.7% of the population was female.

The median income for a household in the county was $34,917, and the median income for a family was $47,219. The per capita income for the county was $20,759.  About 14.0% of families and 17.2% of the population were below the poverty line, including 28.6% of those under age 18 and 9.0% of those age 65 or over.

Politics
Gogebic County was reliably Republican at the beginning of the twentieth century. Roosevelt's New Deal changed the county's mood, which has voted for the Democratic candidate in all but four presidential elections since 1932. In 2016, Donald Trump became the first Republican to win the county since Richard Nixon did in 1972. Trump carried the county again in 2020, despite losing nationally.

Government

The county government operates the jail, maintains rural roads, operates the major local courts, maintains vital records and property records, administers public health regulations, and participates with the state in the provision of welfare and other social services. The county board of commissioners controls the budget and has limited authority to make laws or ordinances. In Michigan, most local
government functions — police and fire, building and zoning, tax assessment, street maintenance, etc. — are the responsibility of individual cities and townships.

Transportation

Major highways

 
  serves the city of Ironwood.

Airport
 KIWD - Gogebic-Iron County Airport – 7 miles (13 km) NE of Ironwood. Commercial air service is available.

Communities

Cities
 Bessemer (county seat)
 Ironwood
 Wakefield

Charter township
 Ironwood Charter Township

Civil townships
 Bessemer Township
 Erwin Township
 Marenisco Township
 Wakefield Township
 Watersmeet Township

Census-designated places
 Marenisco
 Watersmeet

Other unincorporated communities

 Anvil
 Connorville
 Dunham
 Harley
 Puritan
 Ramsay
 Siemens
 Tamarack
 Thayer
 Thomaston
 Tula
 Wellington

Indian reservations
 Lac Vieux Desert Indian Reservation

See also
 List of Michigan State Historic Sites in Gogebic County, Michigan
 National Register of Historic Places listings in Gogebic County, Michigan

References

External links
 Gogebic County government
 Gogebic County Profile, Sam M Cohodas Regional Economist, Tawni Hunt Ferrarini, Ph.D.
 
 Western Upper Peninsula Planning & Development Region

 
Michigan counties
1887 establishments in Michigan
Populated places established in 1887
Michigan placenames of Native American origin